Jeffrey Morgan may refer to:

 Jeffrey Morgan (writer), Canadian writer
 Jeffrey Morgan (musician) (born 1954), American jazz musician and composer
 Jeffrey Dean Morgan (born 1966), American actor
 Jeff Morgan, American businessman
Jeff Morgan (vintner), American winemaker